Ropica Górna  is a village in the administrative district of Gmina Sękowa, within Gorlice County, Lesser Poland Voivodeship, in southern Poland, close to the border with Slovakia.

During World War I heavy fighting took place in the area as part of the important Gorlice-Tarnów Offensive.

The village has a population of 530.

References

Villages in Gorlice County